Farranahineeny Stone Row is a stone row and National Monument located in County Cork, Ireland.

Location

Farranahineeny Stone Row is located 3.4 mi (5.5 mi) south of Inchigeelagh, east of the Shehy Mountains.

History

The stones possibly date to the Bronze Age period.

The purpose of standing stones is unclear; they may have served as boundary markers, ritual or ceremonial sites, burial sites or astrological alignments.

References

National Monuments in County Cork
Megalithic monuments in Ireland